The Sheffield Steelers are a professional ice hockey team located in Sheffield, England. They were formed in 1991 (see 1991 in sport) and play their home games at the Utilita Arena. They are currently a member of the Elite Ice Hockey League. The club's main (title) sponsor is Sheffield Window Centre.

History

Ice Hockey existed in amateur form in Sheffield, but the sport began its return to an era of arenas and stadium size crowds with the opening of the Sheffield Arena in 1991 and the creation of the Sheffield Steelers — the ice hockey team that was to occupy the new arena. The Sheffield Arena was built as part of the city's facilities for the staging of the World Student Games, and is a sizeable stadium originally seating 8,500 and located close to the city centre. Ronnie Wood and David Gardener-Brown were at the helm as the Marketing Director at the club and set about promoting ice hockey to a city raised on the footballing success of Sheffield United and Sheffield Wednesday. Wood had a specific target, seeking to attract children and families to the city's new sporting Arena. They also began taking players to local football matches and together with mascots in an attempt to pull in football fans too. The Steelers' announcer David Simms gave certain players nicknames in the 1991-92 season to help the crowd associate with the players such as 'Rocket Ron Shudra, 'Stormin' Steve Nemeth and 'Magic' Mark Mackie.

The Steelers were named in honour of Sheffield's industrial past, much like the American football team of the same name based in Pittsburgh, Pennsylvania, the sharing of nicknames is merely a coincidence. The American football team actually predates Sheffield's team by 58 years and was already popular worldwide due to their dominance in the National Football League in the 1970s. Sheffield and Pittsburgh are considered sister cities.

The Steelers have continued to fill the capacity of the Arena nearly every season since, including over 9,000 vs Nottingham on Boxing Day 2021. Sheffield began breaking several British ice hockey attendance records, and in March 1996 added an extra 1,200 seats to the Arena to meet the growing demand. The Manchester v Sheffield game in 1997 saw a UK record 17,245, such was the passion for the game at that time.

On Sunday 3 December 2006, the Steelers played in their 1000th ever game. The game was against the Basingstoke Bison at the Hallam FM Arena, for which special orange jerseys had been made for the match. The Steelers lost the game 3–2 and the jerseys were all auctioned off at the game.

2000–present
In the 2000–01 campaign the Steelers completed a Grand Slam, becoming only the second club to win the Autumn Cup, League, Challenge Cup and Playoff Titles in the same season. They retained the Play-off title the following season, the first team to achieve this in the Superleague era, beating Manchester Storm on penalties in the Play-Off final, held at the National Ice Centre in Nottingham in front of a full house.

David Matsos was appointed as coach for the 2006–07 season. He led the Steelers to a fourth-place finish in the league and a place in the Challenge Cup Finals.

In 2007 team Owner Bob Phillips and his wife sold their other Elite League club the Cardiff Devils in order to concentrate on building the Steelers. The club won that season's Elite League Playoff Championship after beating the Coventry Blaze 2–0 in the final with goals from Johnathan Phillips and Dan Tessier. The Steelers were knocked out of the following season's Knockout Cup and Challenge Cup early, but finished first in a league campaign that saw them lose just three times in regulation. They made this a double by beating Nottingham Panthers 2–0 in the Play-Off final. The Steelers season ended in the Quarter Finals of the Play-offs after being knocked out by the Cardiff Devils.

The 2010–11 season was preceded by a "walk-out" of Steelers management and office staff, after a vote of no confidence in Owner Bob Phillips. Phillips put the club up for sale, and in December 2010 Paul Ragan, the CEO and owner of the Cardiff Devils, finalised acquiring the rights to the Sheffield Steelers. The Steelers were at the top of the league for the majority of the season, battling it out with the Cardiff Devils, .and won the league after back-to-back victories against the Braehead Clan. The Steelers were tied on points with Cardiff but won the league having more regulation time wins. After several rounds of negotiations, Simon decided not to renew his contract, and Ryan Finnerty was installed as player/coach after. During that season Sheffield Steelers became the first EIHL team to win a medal in Europe after their appearance in the Continental Cup superfinal.

Tony Smith took over as sole owner in August 2011 after buying out Paul Ragan. The Steelers won the 2013–14 Play-Off final 3–2 against Belfast Giants.

At the end of season 2014–15 they beat the Cardiff Devils to clinch the Elite League title with 74 points. On 20 April 2015, they parted company with coach Gerad Adams. They soon brought in Paul Thompson, former GB coach, as head coach and general manager. At the end of season 2015–16 they became only the second club in the history of ice hockey to become back to back champions when they defeated the Fife Flyers on the final day of the season to take the title.

Paul Thompson left the Sheffield Steelers on 1 October 2018, citing personal reasons. He was replaced as head coach by Tom Barrasso. On 16 April 2019 the club announced that Aaron Fox had been appointed as head coach and general manager of the club.
On 8 March 2020, the Steelers won the 2019–20 Challenge Cup beating Cardiff Devils 4–3 – their first Challenge Cup title for 17 years.

Current squad 
Squad for 2022-23 Elite League season
* Denotes two-way deal with Hull Seahawks of the NIHL
** Denotes two-way deal with Sheffield Steeldogs of the NIHL
*** Denotes two-way deal with Leeds Knights of the NIHL

Honoured members
The Steelers have retired the numbers of six players. Ronnie Wood's number 7 and Tim Cranston's number 4 have been retired. Tony Hand's number 16 and Ken Priestlay's number 9 were retired on 21 January 2003 at a challenge match against the Dundee Stars, with Ron Shudra's number 26 retired in summer 2009. Tommy Plommer's number 11 has also been retired.

Eight people who have been associated with the Steelers have been inducted to the  British Ice Hockey Hall of Fame. Alex Dampier, who coached the Steelers from January 1993 to the end of the 1997–98 season, was inducted in 1995 and Mike Blaisdell, who coached and occasionally iced for the Steelers between 1999 and 2004, was inducted in 2004. On the player front, Chris Kelland was inducted in 2002, Rick Brebant in 2004, Paul Adey in 2006, Scott Neil in 2007, and most recently, legendary players Tim Cranston and 'Rocket' Ron Shudra in December 2010.

The Steelers started their own Hall of Fame in 2005 in which honoured members are voted for by the fans. There are two Hall of Fames: The Players Hall of Fame and the Backroom Staff Hall of Fame. Ken Priestlay, Tommy Plommer, Scott Allison and Tim Cranston were inducted to the Players Hall of Fame in 2005 and Ron Shudra and Mike Blaisdell were inducted in 2006. David Simms, responsible for press and media at the club, and Andy Akers, Equipment Manager, were inducted to the Backroom Staff Hall of Fame in 2006 and Mike O'Connor, general manager, was inducted in 2007.

Honours and awards
League Championships
1994–95, 1995–96, 2000–01, 2002–03, 2003–04, 2008–09, 2010–11, 2014–15, 2015–16

Play Off Championships
1994–95, 1995–96, 1996–97, 2000–01, 2001–02, 2003–04, 2007–08, 2008–09, 2013–14, 2016–17

Autumn Cups
1995–96, 2000–01

Challenge Cups
1998–99, 1999–00, 2000–01, 2002–03, 2019–20

20–20 Hockeyfest Tournament
2009–10

Player of the Year Trophy
Ed Courtenay – 1999–00
David Longstaff – 2000–01
Joel Laing – 2002–03
Mathieu Roy – 2014–15

Coach of the Year Trophy
Mike Blaisdell – 2000–01, 2002–03, 2003–04
David Matsos – 2008–09

The Ice Hockey Annual Trophy (Leading British points scorer)
Tony Hand – 1998–99

First Team All-Star
1994–95 – Martin McKay
1995–96 – Wayne Cowley, Tony Hand, Ken Priestlay
1997–98 – Ed Courtenay
1998–99 – Ed Courtenay, Scott Knowles
1999–00 – Ed Courtenay
2000–01 – Shayne McCosh, David Longstaff
2002–03 – Joel Laing, Marc Laniel
2003–04 – Dion Darling, Kevin Bolibruck, Mark Dutiaume
2006–07 – Dan Tessier
2008–09 – Jody Lehman, Rod Sarich, Steve Munn
2010–11 – Ervins Mustukovs
2014–15 – Ben O'Connor, Michael Forney, Mathieu Roy
2015–16 – Ben O'Connor, Tyler Mosienko
2016–17 – Mathieu Roy
2021–22 – Marc-Olivier Vallerand
Second Team All-Star
1999–00 – Shayne McCosh, Teeder Wynne
2000–01 – Adam Smith
2001–02 – Scott Allison
2002–03 – Dion Darling, Rhett Gordon
2003–04 – Erik Anderson
2005–06 – Mark Dutiaume
2007–08 – Rod Sarich
2010–11 – Jeff Legue, Joey Talbot
2011–12 – Jeff Legue
2015–16 – Mathieu Roy
2017–18 – Ervins Mustukovs, Mark Matheson
2019–20 – Marek Troncinsky, Brendan Connolly, Marc-Olivier Vallerand
2021–22 – Daine Todd

Grand slam winning teams
The Steelers have won the Grand Slam of all available trophies twice in their history. In the 1995–96 season they won the Benson & Hedges Cup, the league championship and the playoffs. In the 2000–01 season they won the Benson & Hedges Cup, the Challenge Cup, the league championship and the playoffs. The players who played for the Steelers those seasons were:

1995–96 team
Goaltenders
Wayne Cowley
Dave Graham (went to Guildford Flames after three games)
Martin McKay

Defenders
Neil Abel
Perry Doyle
Scott Heaton
Chris Kelland
Andre Malo
Mike O'Connor
Ron Shudra
Jamie Van der Horst
Rob Wilson
Mark Wright

Forwards
Scott Knowles
Nicky Chinn
Tim Cranston
Justin George
Tony Hand
David Longstaff (joined from Newcastle Warriors part way through the season)
Tommy Plommer
Ken Priestlay
Les Millie (went to Fife Flyers after five games)
Scott Neil
Steve Nemeth

2000–01 team
Goaltenders
Mike O'Neill
Mike Torchia

Defenders
Steve Carpenter
Shayne McCosh
Jeff Sebastian
Kayle Short
Adam Smith
Dennis Vial

Forwards
Paul Adey
Scott Allison
Paul Beraldo
Mike Blaisdell, Coach (played four games injury cover)
Brent Bobyck (joined from Bracknell Bees part way through the season then went to Manchester Storm after 32 games)
Rick Brebant
Dale Craigwell
David Longstaff
Scott Metcalfe
Warren Norris
Steve Roberts (went to Belfast Giants after 27 games)
Kent Simpson
Jason Weaver

Season-by-season record

Note: GP = Games played, W = Wins, L = Losses, T = Ties, OTL = Overtime losses, Pts = Points, GF = Goals for, GA = Goals against

†Finished second with 60 points. However, five points were deducted for breaking the wage cap
‡Three points were awarded for a win in the 2000–01 season
††Five team league
†††The 2019–20 season was cancelled in March 2020, with Sheffield having played 49 games, due to the coronavirus pandemic. The above stats reflect the Steelers' position at the time of the cancellation.
††††The 2020–21 Elite League season - originally scheduled for a revised start date of 5 December - was suspended on 15 September 2020, because of ongoing coronavirus pandemic restrictions. The EIHL board determined that the season was non-viable without supporters being permitted to attend matches and unanimously agreed to a suspension. The season was cancelled completely in February 2021. Sheffield were later announced as one of four Elite League teams taking part in the 'Elite Series' between April–May 2021, a total of 24 games culminating in a best-of-three play-off final series.

Club records

League titles
British Premier Division Titles: 2 (1994/95, 1995/96)
Superleague Titles: 2 (2000/01, 2002/03)
Elite League Titles: 5 (2003/04, 2008/09, 2010/11, 2014/15, 2015/16)

Cup titles
Yorkshire Cup: 2 (1993/94, 1994/95)
Benson & Hedges Cup: 2 (1995/95, 2000/01)
Challenge Cup: 5 (1998/99, 1999/00, 2000/01, 2002/03, 2019/20)
Knockout Cup: 1 (2005/06)
20/20 Hockeyfest: 1 (2009/10)
Charity Shield: 1 (2009/10)

Play-off titles
British Championship: 10 (1994/95, 1995/96, 1996/97, 2000/01, 2001/02, 2003/04, 2007/08, 2009/09, 2013/14, 2016/17)

Team records
Most points in a season: 104 --- 3 pts for a win (2000/01) 92 --- 2 pts for a win (2003/04)
Most wins in a season: 44 (2003/04)
Most regulation losses in a season: 26 (2009/10)
Most overtime losses in a season: 8 (2006/07)
Most ties in a season: 12 (2001/02) ---  ties ceased after the 2005/06 Season
Most goals scored in regular season: 378 (1991/92)
Most goals conceded in regular season: 198 (1993/94)
Fewest goals scored in regular season: 105 (2005/06)
Fewest goals conceded in regular season: 106 (2003/04)
Highest league position: 1st (1994/95, 1995/96, 2000/01, 2002/03, 2003/04, 2008/09, 2010/11, 2014/15)
Lowest league position: 7th (2018/19)
Most goals scored in a single game (competitive): 30 (30–4 .v. Solent Vikings, 15 March 1992)
Most goals conceded in a single game (competitive): 14 (14–3 @ Basingstoke Beavers, 7 November 1992, 14–10 @ Durham Wasps, 18 September 1993)
Biggest winning margin at home (competitive): 26 goals (30–4 .v. Solent Vikings, 15 March 1992)
Biggest winning margin on the road (competitive): 25 goals (4–29 @ Sunderland Chiefs, 28 December 1991)
Biggest losing margin at home (competitive): 6 goals (2–8 .v. Whitley Warriors, 16 October 1993, 0–6 .v. London Knights, 11 September 1999, 1–7 .v. Belfast Giants, 19 February 2006, 1–7 .v. Cardiff Devils, 12 January 2011)
Biggest losing margin on the Road (competitive): 11 goals (14–3 @ Basingstoke Beavers, 7 November 1992, 12–1 @ Cardiff Devils, 24 April 1994)
No. of Teams shutout (all time): 97
Most shutouts in a season (team, all comps): 10 (2008/09)
Team shutout most (all time): Nottingham Panthers (14)
No. of times shutout (all time): 37
Most times shutout in a season (all comps): 8 (2005/06)
Team most shutout against (all time): Nottingham Panthers (8)
Longest winning streak (all comps): 13 games (07/09/2000 – 11 October 2000)
Longest losing streak (all comps): 7 games (23 February 2003 – 15 March 2003)
Longest unbeaten streak (home, all comps): 53 games (49 Wins, 4 Ties – 27 December 1993 to 19 October 1996)
Highest attendance (home): 10,136 (Sheffield Steelers 5–2 Nottingham Panthers, 2 December 1995, Benson & Hedges Cup Final)
Highest attendance (away): 17,245 (Manchester Storm 6–2 Sheffield Steelers, 23 February 1997, Superleague)

Individual records
Most Games Played: Jonathan Phillips (804)
Most Goals Scored (All Time): Steve Nemeth (356)
Most Assists (All Time): Ron Shudra (463)
Most Points Scored (All Time): Ron Shudra (792)
Most Penalty Minutes (All Time): Tommy Plommer (1,007)
Most Goals Scored in a Regular Season: Steve Nemeth (92) (1991–1992)
Most Assists in a Regular Season: Mark Mackie (101) (1991–92)
Most Points Scored in a Regular Season: Steve Nemeth (186) (1991–92)
Most Penalty Minutes in a Regular Season: Andrew Sharpe (230) (2008–09)
Most Goals Scored in a Play-Off Championship: Steve Nemeth (21) (1991–92)
Most Assists in a Play-Off Championship: Steve Nemeth (18) (1991–92)
Most Points Scored in a Play-Off Championship: Steve Nemeth (39) (1991–92)
Most Penalty Minutes in a Play-Off Championship: Timo Willman (77) (2002–03)

Goaltender records
Most Games Played (All Time): Jody Lehman (252)
Most Minutes Played (All Time): Jody Lehman (14,927)
Most Wins (All Time): Jody Lehman (142)
Most Losses (All Time): Jody Lehman (73)
Most Shutouts in a Season (All Comps): Ervins Mustukovs (11) (2010–11)
Most Shutouts (All Time): Jody Lehman (24)
Best Goals Against Average (All Time): Christian Bronsard (1.23) (Min. 30 Games Played)
Best Save Percentage (All Time): Christian Bronsard (94.5%) (Min. 30 Games Played)

References

External links
Sheffield Steelers

 
Ice hockey teams in England
Ice hockey clubs established in 1991
Sports teams and clubs in Sheffield
Elite Ice Hockey League teams
1991 establishments in England